The Sangbad is a Bengali-language daily newspaper, founded in 1951 and published from Dhaka, Bangladesh. It is the oldest newspaper in Bangladesh.

History 
The Sangbad was founded in 1951 and published from Dhaka, Bangladesh. Its first owner was Nasiruddin Ahmad and its first editor was Khairul Kabir. During the 1950s and 1960s the newspaper expressed strong views opposed to the Ayub Khan government of Pakistan, and was accordingly repressed. Its offices and printing pressed were burned during the crackdown in March 1971, and it remained closed during the entire Bangladesh Liberation War.

On 31 October 2017 a journalist of the Sangbad was arrested under the Information and Communication Technology (ICT) Act. He had shown people screenshots of fake photos of the President and Prime Minister on his phone.

Bazlur Rahman was a editor of the newspaper. In November 2020, the acting editor of the newspaper, Khandaker Muniruzzaman, died after catching COVID-19 during the COVID-19 pandemic in Bangladesh.

Notable writers 
The paper has been a fertile ground for radical thought and Bengali-language literature. It was the first Bengali newspaper to have a women's section. Notable contributors include:

 Bazlur Rahman
 Santosh Gupta
 Zahur Hossain Chowdhury
 Satyen Sen
 Mohammad Farhad
 Laila Samad
 Kamal Lohani

References

Bengali-language newspapers published in Bangladesh
Daily newspapers published in Bangladesh
Publications established in 1951
Newspapers published in Dhaka